Lieutenant General Syed Salahuddin Tirmizi  (born 1 May 1943) is a Pakistani politician who served as Minister for Narcotics Control, in Abbasi cabinet from August 2017 to May 2018. He has been a member of the Senate of Pakistan, representing Pakistan Muslim League (N) since March 2015.

Early life and education
He was born on 1 May 1943 in Mansehra. He studied at Cadet College Hasan Abdal before attending Pakistan Military Academy Kakul from where he received B.A degree. He received his B.Sc. Honours degree from Balochistan University in Quetta and completed his M.Sc. in War Studies from Quaid-e-Azam University in 1984.

He belongs to the noble Syed family of Kaghan and is also referred to as the 'Chief of Kaghan' after his father. His father was Syed Mehmood Shah, Member of the Legislative Assembly and Chief of Kaghan.

Military career
He was commissioned in Pakistan Army, Armoured Corps in October, 1964. His major assignments in Pakistan Army were Instructor at the National Defence College, Islamabad (now National Defence University), Commander 3rd Independent Armoured Brigade Group, Chief of Staff IV Corps, General Officer Commanding First Armoured Division, Director General Armoured Corps, GHQ.

Director General Anti Narcotics Task Force (ANTF), Chairman Pakistan Narcotics Board (PNCB) and later, on merger of the two departments, the first Director General of Anti Narcotics Force (ANF), he also held additional appointment of Secretary Narcotics Control Division during the period of merger of ANTF and PNCB, raising the force as well as framing its laws.

He was also Corps Commander II Corps, also known as II Strike Corps and Commandant National Defence College, Islamabad (now National Defence University) from 25 Oct 1998 - 2 Mar 2000.

He has visited various countries of Asia, Europe, North America, South America and Australia as Leader / Member of Pakistani Delegation on Study Tours, Conferences and Courses.

Political career

He ran for the seat of the National Assembly of Pakistan from constituency NA-20 Manshera-I in 2002 Pakistani general election. He was declared unsuccessful amid an election that has been widely considered to be rigged by General Musharraf's regime, with concerns about their legitimacy raised by international watchdogs.

He joined Pakistan Muslim League (N) in 2006 and ran for the seat of the National Assembly of Pakistan from constituency NA-20 Manshera-I as a candidate of Pakistan Muslim League (N) in 2008 Pakistani general election. He was declared successful, however, a re-poll was allowed by the courts in the losing candidate's home constituency, enabling the result to be overturned in the losing candidate's favour. "The winning candidate from NA-20, Mansehra, Lt-Gen (retired) Salahuddin Tirmizi of PML-N challenged the order of the Chief Election Commission (CEC) in the Peshawar High Court's Abbottabad bench regarding re-polling at two polling stations of the constituency on March 13." These elections were also held under General Musharraf's regime.

He was elected to the Senate of Pakistan as a candidate of Pakistan Muslim League (N) in 2015 Pakistani Senate election.

Following the election of Shahid Khaqan Abbasi as Prime Minister of Pakistan in August 2017, he was inducted into the federal cabinet. He was appointed as the Federal Minister of Narcotics Control. He served at the post till the dissolution of the National Assembly on the expiration of its term on 31 May 2018.

Awards and decorations

References

Living people
Pakistani senators (14th Parliament)
Pakistan Muslim League (N) politicians
Pakistani generals
Government ministers of Pakistan
1943 births
People from Mansehra District